Irina-Camelia Begu and Monica Niculescu were the defending champions but Niculescu decided not to participate.
Begu teamed up alongside Simona Halep, but they lost in the quarterfinals to Tímea Babos and Mandy Minella.
Garbiñe Muguruza and María Teresa Torró Flor won the title, defeating Babos and Minella in the final 6–3, 7–6(7–5).

Seeds

Draw

References 
 Main Draw

2013 Moorilla Hobart International
Hobart International – Doubles